Balmoral is a civil parish in Restigouche County, New Brunswick, Canada.

For governance purposes it is divided between the city of Campbellton, the town of Heron Bay, the village of Bois-Joli, the Moose Meadows 4 Indian reserve, and the Restigouche rural district, all of which are members of the Restigouche Regional Service Commission.

Before the 2023 governance reform, along Route 275 beginning near the eastern parish line and running southwest to the western parish line were the village of Balmoral, the local service district of Blair Athol, and the village of Atholville, with the LSD of Balmoral-St. Maure along the southern boundary of Balmoral; small areas in the northeastern corner were part of the villages of Eel River Crossing and Charlo, and the remainder of the parish formed the LSD of the parish of Balmoral, often called Balmoral-Maltais to distinguish it from Balmoral-St. Maure. The reform amalgamated Balmoral, Balmoral-St. Maure, Blair Athol, and parts of the parish LSD along the Boissonault, Drapeau and Saint-Maure Roads with Eel River Crossing and areas neighbouring it to form Bois-Joli; Campbellton annexed part of the parish LSD along the southern side of McAbbie Road, Heron Bay annexed two areas of the parish LSD along the eastern parish line, and the remainder of the parish LSD became part of the rural district.

Origin of name
The parish may have gotten its name from Balmoral Castle, Scotland, increasingly used by Queen Victoria at the time. William F. Ganong had no idea of its origin, noting only that there was a place of that name in Scotland.

History
Balmoral was erected in 1896 from Dalhousie Parish.

Boundaries
Balmoral Parish is bounded:

 on the northwest and north by a line beginning at a point about 350 metres north of Route 275 and about 900 metres westerly of the junction of Val-d'Amour Road with Route 275, then running northeasterly along the northwestern edge of the Balmoral Settlement to its northeastern corner, then turning 90º and running about 250 metres southeasterly, then turning 90º and running to Route 275, then running easterly along the southern edge of grants along Route 280 then those along Route 11 to meet a line running true south from near the northern end of the Eel River Bar Seawall;
 on the east by the line running due south from the Eel River Bar Seawall to the Northumberland County line;
 on the south by the county line;
 on the west by a line beginning on the county line about 2.9 kilometres west of the Lower West Branch Portage Brook, then running true north to the starting point.

Communities
Communities at least partly within the parish. bold indicates an incorporated municipality or Indian reserve

 Atholville
 Balmoral
 Selwood
 Upper Balmoral
 Blair Athol
 Charlo
 Eel River Crossing
 Macabee (Brassard)
 Maltais (partly in Balmoral)
 Moose Meadows 4
 Ramsay Sheds
 Saint-Maure (partly in Balmoral)
 Simpsons Field

Bodies of water
Bodies of water at least partly within the parish.

 Charlo River
 Eel River
 Jacquet River
 Little Southeast Upsalquitch River
 Popelogan River
 Popelogan Lake Branch River
 South Charlo River
 Southeast Upsalquitch River
 more than twenty officially named lakes

Other notable places
Parks, historic sites, and other noteworthy places at least partly within the parish.
 Budworm City airstrip
 Goulette Brook Protected Natural Area
 Mount Akroyd Protected Natural Area
 Portage Lakes Protected Natural Area
 White Meadows

Demographics
Parish population total did not include portions within Moose Meadows 4 or former municipalities. Revised census figures based on the 2023 local governance reforms have not been released.

Population

Language

Access Routes
Highways and numbered routes that run through the parish, including external routes that start or finish at the parish limits:

Highways
None

Principal Routes

Secondary Routes:

External Routes:
None

See also
List of parishes in New Brunswick

Notes

References

External links
 Village of Atholville
 Village of Balmoral
 Village of Charlo
 Village of Eel River Crossing

Parishes of Restigouche County, New Brunswick
Local service districts of Restigouche County, New Brunswick